National Highway 206 (NH 206) was a National Highway in India within the state of Karnataka and Andhra Pradesh. NH 206 connected the towns of Chittoor and Honnavar, Via: Sira, Kadur, Shivamogga and it was 650 km long.

Before it was upgraded to a National Highway, the NH 206 was designated as State Highway 68 (SH 68), and alternatively known as B.H. Road (Bangalore-Honnavar Road). At Honnavar, it started at the junction with NH 17 and crossed NH 13 before joining the former NH 4 near Sira. (NH4 has now been renumbered as NH48).

All the National Highways were renumbered in the year 2010. The highway is presently designated a new number NH 69.

Route

Bangarupalem,
Palamaner,
Mulabagilu,
Chintamani,
Chikkaballapur,
Gauribidanur,
Madhugiri,
Sira,
Banavara,
Kadur,
Tarikere, 
Bhadravathi
Shivamogga,
Sagara,
Jog Falls,
Honnavar,

See also
 List of National Highways in India (by Highway Number)
 List of National Highways in India
 National Highways Development Project
Banavara

References

External links 
 NH network map of India

206
National highways in India (old numbering)